Little Joe is a 2019 internationally co-produced drama film directed by Jessica Hausner. It was selected to compete for the Palme d'Or at the 2019 Cannes Film Festival. At Cannes, Emily Beecham won the award for Best Actress. Beecham stars as Alice Woodard, a plant breeder and single mother who creates "Little Joe", a plant that gives its caretakers joy.

Plot
Alice Woodard (Emily Beecham) is a plant breeder who works in a lab that focuses on creating new strains of flowers. While her colleague Bella (Kerry Fox) is failing at creating a hardy plant that will survive even weeks of undernourishment and neglect, Alice and her team have successfully created a flower that requires more care than an ordinary plant but which makes their owners happy.

Alice decides to name the plants "Little Joe" in honour of her son and smuggles out one of the plants for him.

The Little Joes begin to aggressively pollinate, which Alice theorizes is because she has made them sterile. The same day Bella's dog, Bello, goes missing. Chris (Ben Whishaw) goes looking for him and accidentally inhales some of the pollen. Later on he takes Alice out and, despite her obvious reluctance, attempts to kiss her twice.

The following day Bella finds Bello in the lab. He attacks her and she insists that he has changed. Chris later tells Alice that Bella is mentally ill and had previously attempted suicide before being forced on a year-long sabbatical, returning only shortly before Alice began working at the lab. Alice later learns that Bella had Bello put down. Bella tells Alice that the changes to Bello were due to the plant.

Alice's son is accidentally pollinated by the plant and begins to act strangely, sneaking his classmate Selma into the lab and stealing a Little Joe. He later tells Alice that he is considering moving in with his father, Ivan.

Bothered by her son's behaviour, Alice begins to examine test footage of subjects who have been exposed to the pollen. In every case their family members report that they are acting strangely and have seemed to change since the pollen test. However, just as Alice begins to believe Bella's suspicions, Bella is exposed to the pollen herself and dismisses her previous beliefs as paranoia due to her mental issues.

Joe reveals that he and Selma stole the plant in order to pollinate Ivan, confirming Alice's suspicions that her plant carries a virus, especially as she has used unorthodox methods to create Little Joe. However, this turns out to be a joke as Chris previously talked to Joe about Alice's concerns. At work Bella reveals that she never inhaled the pollen and was only pretending to be happy in order to blend in with the others. Immediately afterwards, Alice overhears Bella fall off of a staircase during a confrontation with Chris.

After Alice's boss dismisses her concerns she takes matters into her own hands and decides to kill the Little Joes before they are commercialized, lowering the temperature in the lab. She is stopped by Chris, who, in trying to prevent her from harming the plants, knocks her out on the floor of the lab, exposing her to the plant pollen.

Later Alice learns that Little Joe has been nominated for an award, meaning that the plant will be sold worldwide. When Chris apologizes for hitting her she kisses him, and later dismisses her concerns as paranoia. She allows Joe to move in with his father and starts a new, happier life with her own Little Joe.

Cast
 Emily Beecham as Alice Woodard
 Ben Whishaw as Chris
 Kerry Fox as Bella
 Kit Connor as Joe Woodard
 David Wilmot as Karl
 Phénix Brossard as Ric 
 Sebastian Hülk as Ivan
 Lindsay Duncan as Psychotherapist
 Jessie Mae Alonzo as Selma
 Andrew Rajan as Jasper
 Janine Duvitski as Eleanore
 Goran Kostic as Mr Simic
 Leanne Best as Brittany

Release

Little Joe had its world premiere at the Cannes Film Festival on 17 May 2019. Shortly after, Magnolia Pictures and BFI Distribution acquired U.S. and U.K. distribution right to the film. It was scheduled to be released in Austria on 1 November 2019, by Filmladen; in the United States on 6 December 2019; Germany on 9 January 2020, by X Verleih AG; and the United Kingdom on 21 February 2020.

Reception
The site's critics consensus reads: "Little Joes unorthodox approach may baffle horror fans lured in by its premise – but like its title character, the end result exerts a creepy thrall." On Metacritic, the film has a weighted average score of 60 out of 100 based on 25 critics, indicating "mixed or average reviews".

References

External links
 
 

2019 films
2019 drama films
Austrian drama films
British drama films
English-language Austrian films
English-language German films
BBC Film films
Films directed by Jessica Hausner
Films about plants
2010s English-language films
2010s British films